Afrospilarctia unipuncta is a moth of the family Erebidae. It was described by George Hampson in 1905. It is found in Angola, the Democratic Republic of the Congo, Kenya, Malawi, Rwanda, Tanzania, Uganda and Zimbabwe.

References

Spilosomina
Moths described in 1905
Moths of Africa